Emma Navarro (born May 18, 2001) is an American tennis player.

Navarro has a career-high singles ranking by the Women's Tennis Association (WTA) of 127, achieved on 26 September 2022. She also has a career-high WTA doubles ranking of 318, achieved on 2 August 2021. She won the 2019 Junior French Open Doubles Championship with Chloe Beck, and they also finished runners-up in the 2019 Junior Australian Open Championship.

Navarro made her WTA Tour main-draw debut at the 2019 Charleston Open, after receiving wildcards for the singles and doubles tournaments. She was rated as the best tennis recruit in the nation, and committed to the University of Virginia for the Fall 2020 semester. Navarro won the NCAA Division 1 women’s singles title on 28 May 2021 as a freshman. With this win, she earned a wildcard into the 2021 US Open main draw.

Navarro is the daughter of billionaire businessman Ben Navarro, and the granddaughter of former American football player and coach, Frank Navarro.

Grand Slam performance timelines

Singles

Doubles

Junior Grand Slam finals

Singles: 1 (runner-up)

Doubles: 2 (1 title, 1 runner-up)

ITF Circuit finals

Singles: 6 (3 titles, 3 runner-ups)

Doubles: 1 (title)

References

External links
 
 

2001 births
Living people
American female tennis players
French Open junior champions
Sportspeople from New York City
Sportspeople from Charleston, South Carolina
Grand Slam (tennis) champions in girls' doubles
Tennis people from South Carolina
21st-century American women
Virginia Cavaliers women's tennis players